is a Japanese football player. He plays for Gainare Tottori.

Career
After attending Kansai University - where he also served as captain - Ishii signed with the J3 League club Gainare Tottori in December 2016.

Club statistics
Updated to 23 August 2018.

References

External links

Profile at Gainare Tottori
Profile at J. League

1995 births
Living people
Kansai University alumni
Association football people from Shizuoka Prefecture
Japanese footballers
J3 League players
Gainare Tottori players
Association football midfielders